Rolland Francis Hatfield served as Minnesota State Auditor from 1971 through 1975. Hatfield, a resident of Ramsey County, Minnesota, was a member of the Minnesota Republican Party.

References

Minnesota Republicans
State Auditors of Minnesota
Year of birth missing
Year of death missing